Fotballklubben Gevir Bodø ("Gevir" means antler) was a Norwegian association football club from Bodø, Nordland.

The men's football team last played in the Norwegian Second Division in 1999. After the 2000 season it contested playoffs to win re-promotion, but failed. Ten years later the club did not field any senior team, only one veteran's team.

References

Official site

Defunct football clubs in Norway
Sport in Bodø
1977 establishments in Norway
Association football clubs established in 1977